Albert Henry may refer to:

 Albert Henry (historian) (1910–2002), Belgian historian
 Albert Henry (politician) (1907–1981), first Premier of the Cook Islands
 Albert Henry (rugby union), rugby union player who represented Australia
 Albert Henry (cricketer) (c. 1880–1909), Aboriginal Australian cricketer
 Al Henry (born 1949), Albert Henry, basketball player
 Al B. Henry (1911–1989), American politician

See also